Metapenaeopsis miersi is a crustacean species in the family Penaeidae described by Lipke Bijdeley Holthuis in 1952.

References 

Penaeidae
Crustaceans
Crustaceans described in 1952
Taxa named by Lipke Holthuis